The 2017 Dayton Flyers football team represented the University of Dayton in the 2017 NCAA Division I FCS football season. They were led by 10th-year head coach Rick Chamberlin and played their home games at Welcome Stadium. They were a member of the Pioneer Football League. They finished the season 5–6, 4–4 in PFL play to finish in a tie for sixth place.

Schedule

Source: Schedule

Game summaries

at Robert Morris

Southeast Missouri State

Duquesne

at Morehead State

San Diego

at Drake

Campbell

at Davidson

Butler

Marist

at Valparaiso

References

Dayton
Dayton Flyers football seasons
Dayton Flyers football